Koyva is a rural locality (a settlement) in Gornozavodsky District, Perm Krai, Russia. The population was 302 as of 2010. There are 21 streets.

References 

Rural localities in Gornozavodsky District